Michael Maclear, OC (1929 – December 25, 2018) was an award-winning Anglo-Canadian journalist, documentary filmmaker,
and former correspondent for various CBC programs and for CTV's W5.
He is the great-great-grand-nephew of South African astronomer Sir Thomas Maclear.

Born in London, UK in 1929, Maclear moved to Canada in 1954 and joined the Canadian Broadcasting Corporation the next year. As a foreign correspondent for CBC (1961–1971) and the CTV Television Network, he travelled to more than 80 countries.

Maclear  made  several  wartime  visits  to North  Vietnam  (1969-1970-1972) for  CBC  and  later  for  CTV,  the  first  Western  TV  correspondent granted  admission  to  the  North.  In  1963 as  CBC's  Far  East correspondent  based  in  Japan  he  married  Yoko  (Mariko)  Koide,  a news  researcher  whose  contacts  with  the   newsfilm  agency Nihon  Denpa  News   and  its   Hanoi  bureau   made  possible  a series  of  exclusive  reports  also  aired  by  CBS,  NBC  and  syndicated by  The New York Times.  Subsequently,   Yoko's  contacts  were  key to  obtaining  Hanoi's  military  archives  for  the  13- hour  television history  "Vietnam:  The  10,000  Day  War,"  which  Maclear independently  produced  in  1980.

He received numerous awards, including an ACTRA Award for Best Broadcaster, three Gemini Awards, and the Canadian Film and Television Producers Association's Personal Achievement Award. In 2004, he won the "Outstanding Achievement Award" at Hot Docs, an annual documentary film festival held in Toronto, Ontario, where he was also honoured with a 13-film retrospective.

His daughter, Kyo Maclear, wrote the novel The Letter Opener, published in Canada by HarperCollins in 2007. Michael Maclear has two grandsons, Yoshi and Mika.

Selected filmography
 Vietnam: The Ten Thousand Day War (1980), producer
 The Canadians (1988), writer and executive producer, for CTV
 America at War (2004), director

Selected publications
 The Ten Thousand Day War: Vietnam, 1945-1975 (1981, Methuen)
 Guerrilla Nation: My Wars in and Out of Vietnam (2013, Dundurn Press )

References

External links
Obituary by Peter Mansbridge, Chief Correspondent of CBC News; https://www.cbc.ca/news/canada/michael-maclear-cbc-reporter-1.4959954

 
 unavailable 27 May 2019.

Canadian television journalists
Canadian documentary film producers
British expatriates in Canada
Journalists from London
1929 births
2018 deaths
CBC Television people
CTV Television Network people
Officers of the Order of Canada